The Cachantún Cup is a professional tennis tournament played on outdoor red clay courts. It is part of the Association of Tennis Professionals (ATP) Challenger Tour. It was held annually in Providencia, Chile, from 2005 to 2009. The tournament was then moved to Vitacura, Santiago Metropolitan Region. The October editions of 2021 were played at the Club Palestino in Las Condes.

Past finals

Singles

Doubles

External links
Official website
ITF search

ATP Challenger Tour
Clay court tennis tournaments
Tennis tournaments in Chile

Autumn events in Chile
Recurring sporting events established in 2005
2005 establishments in Chile
Sport in Santiago Metropolitan Region